The Australasian snapper (Chrysophrys auratus) or silver seabream is a species of porgie found in coastal waters of Australia, Philippines, Indonesia, mainland China, Taiwan, Japan and New Zealand. Its distribution areas in the Northern and Southern Hemispheres are disjunct. Although it is almost universally known in Australia and New Zealand as snapper, it does not belong to the snapper family, Lutjanidae. It is highly prized as an edible fish, with a sweet sea taste and a firm texture.

The species name is Chrysophrys auratus, but previously referred to as Pagrus auratus.

Regional variation in naming

Australia: cocknies (young smaller than legal size), red bream or pinkies (legal size), squire or squirefish (when bigger), snapper (at full size)

Western Australia: "pink snapper" to distinguish it from unrelated species

Victoria: also schnapper (ref: Schnapper Point, Mornington)

South Australia: the name "ruggers" is often used for smaller fish of legal size

Aboriginal people of the Port Jackson area in Australia: they called it wollamie (also spelt wollamai, and other variations). European colonists there knew it as the "light horseman", for the resemblance of the fish's skull to the helmet of a light horseman.

New Zealand: snapper (or New Zealand snapper when there is need to distinguish from other species of snapper). New Zealand Māori: tāmure (adult fish), karatī (juveniles)

Habitat

The Australasian snapper is found on all coasts of New Zealand, especially in the north. In Australia, it is found along the south coast, mainly near Kiama, Berry, Gerringong, Gerroa, Huskisson, Vincentia, and Shoalhaven. It is also found on the coast of Tasmania, but in smaller numbers. They school, and will migrate between reefs. Larger fish are known to enter estuaries and harbours, for example Port Phillip Bay has a renowned seasonal snapper run.

Growth rates within the wild stocks vary with some (i.e. the Hauraki Gulf, NZ) growing rapidly and to a smaller maximum length, while stocks in east and west Australia are known to grow more slowly. The species is capable of living about 40 years throughout much of its range in Australia, and the Australian recordholder of 40 years and 10 months was a  large-nosed male, caught on 1 September 2007 off Bunbury, West Australia, and photographed on the day of capture. Large individuals of both sexes develop a prominent hump on the head. Anglers are advised not to take immature fish, so as not to reduce breeding stock. During spawning, these fish obtain a metallic green sheen which indicates a high concentration of acid buildup within the scales' infrastructure. Minimum sizes are supposed to be designed to allow these fish to participate in spawning runs at least once before they become available to the fishery, but given the slow growth rates of this species, a need exists to consider area closures and/or further increase the minimum sizes in each state to reduce the chances of growth overfishing of the various populations of snapper throughout its range. This may be important with recent developments in technology such as GPS.

Fisheries

Catches of Australasian snapper have varied between 25,600 and 34,300 tonnes in 2000–2009, with Japan and New Zealand reporting the largest catches.

See also
 Cape Woolamai, named after the fish
 Porgie fishing

References

External links 

 Fisheries Western Australia - Pink Snapper Fact Sheet
 Snapper, Fishfiles by Fisheries Research and Development Corporation
 Snapper Fishing Spots in Sydney - Further Information Red Snappers.
 Fishes of Australia : Pagrus auratus

Australian snapper
Marine fish of Australia
Marine fauna of East Asia
Marine fish of New Zealand
Fish of Oceania
Commercial fish
Taxa named by Johann Reinhold Forster
Australian snapper